is a railway station in Yakumo, Futami District, Hokkaidō Prefecture, Japan.

Lines
Hokkaido Railway Company
Hakodate Main Line Station H55

Adjacent stations

Railway stations in Hokkaido Prefecture
Railway stations in Japan opened in 1903
Yakumo, Hokkaido